The Government of Karnataka, abbreviated as, GoK, or simply Karnataka Government, formerly Government of Mysore, is a democratically-elected state body with the governor as the ceremonial head to govern the Southwest Indian state of Karnataka. The governor who is appointed for five years appoints the chief minister and on the advice of the chief minister appoints his council of ministers. Even though the governor remains the ceremonial head of the state, the day-to-day running of the government is taken care of by the chief minister and his council of ministers in whom a great amount of legislative powers are vested.

Administrative divisions

Karnataka State has been divided into 4 revenue divisions, 49 sub-divisions, 31 districts, 237 taluks, 747 hoblies/ revenue circles and 6,022 gram panchayats for administrative purposes.
The state has 281 towns and 7 municipal corporations. Bangalore is the largest urban agglomeration. It is among the fastest growing cities in the world.

Political and administrative reorganization

Karnataka took its present shape in 1956, when the states of Mysore and Coorg (Kodagu) were merged with the Kannada-speaking districts of the former states of Bombay and Hyderabad, and Madras. Mysore state was made up of 10 districts: Bangalore, Kolar, Tumkur, Mandya, Mysore, Hassan, Chikmagalur (Kadur), Shimoga and Chitradurga; Bellary was transferred from Madras state to Mysore in 1953, when the new Andhra State was created out of Madras' northern districts. Kodagu became a district, and Dakshina Kannada (South Kanara) district was transferred from Madras state, Uttara Kannada (North Kanara), Dharwad, Belgaum District, and Bijapur District from Bombay state, and Bidar District, Kalaburgi District, and Raichur District from Hyderabad state.

In 1989, Bangalore Rural district was carved out of Bangalore district. In 1997, Bagalkot district was carved out of Vijayapura district, Chamrajnagar out of Mysore, Gadag out of Dharwad, Haveri out of Dharwad, Koppal out of Raichur, Udupi out of Dakshina Kannada and Yadgir out of Kalaburagi. Davanagere district was created from parts of Bellary, Chitradurga, Dharwad and Shimoga.
In 2020, Vijayanagara district was carved out of Ballari district, to become the 31st district in the state. As a result, the world heritage site of Hampi, the erstwhile capital of Vijayanagara empire, is now part of a new district - Vijayanagara.

Legislature

The state legislature is bicameral and consists of the Legislative Assembly and the Legislative Council. The Legislative Assembly consists of 224 members with one member nominated by the governor to represent the Anglo-Indian community. The term of office of the members is five years and the term of a member elected to the council is six years. The Legislative Council is a permanent body with one-third of its members retiring every two years.

Ministry
The government is headed by the governor who appoints the chief minister and his council of ministers. The governor is appointed for five years and acts as the constitutional head of the state. Even though the governor remains the ceremonial head of the state, the day-to-day running of the government is taken care of by the chief minister and his council of ministers in whom a great deal of legislative powers is vested..

The secretariat headed by the secretary to the governor assists the council of ministers. The council of ministers consists of cabinet ministers, ministers of state and deputy ministers. The chief minister is assisted by the chief secretary, who is the head of the administrative services.

As of August 2021, the Government of Karnataka consists of 30 ministers including Chief Minister.

Chief Minister

The Chief Minister of Karnataka is the chief executive of the Indian state of Karnataka.  As per the Constitution of India, the governor is a state's de jure head, but de facto executive authority rests with the chief minister. Following elections to the Karnataka Legislative Assembly, the state's governor usually invites the party (or coalition) with a majority of seats to form the government. The governor appoints the chief minister, whose council of ministers are collectively responsible to the assembly. Given that he has the confidence of the assembly, the chief minister's term is for five years and is subject to no term limits.

Cabinet

Karnataka Panchayat Raj
This is a 3-tier system in the state with elected bodies at the village (grama), taluka and district (zilla) levels. It ensures greater participation of people and effective implementation of rural development programs. There is a Grama Panchayat for a village (grama) or a group of villages (gramas), a Taluka Panchayat at the taluka level and a Zilla Panchayat at the district (zilla) level.

All the 3 institutions are made up of elected representatives and there is no provision for nomination by the governor to any of these councils. Karnataka was the first state in the country to enact the Panchayat Raj Act, incorporating all provisions of the 73rd Amendment to the Constitution.

In 2014, Karnataka State Grama Panchayats Delimitation Committee was constituted by the government of Karnataka, with Chairman S G Nanjaiahna Mutt and 6 members. The joint secretary of the committee was Dr. Revaiah Odeyar. The report was submitted on October 30, 2014. This resulted in the implementation of Gram Panchayath Elections in 2015.

Karnataka Panchayat Administrative Service (KPAS), is the civil service of Karnataka state. The Rural Development and Panchayat Raj Department conducts exams to recruit candidates for the service. The KPAS officers are usually appointed as Panchayat Development Officers (PDOs). They are trained under the Abdul Nazeer Sab State Institute of Rural Development and Panchayat Raj (ANSSIRDPR), Mysuru.

The Karnataka Gram Swaraj and Panchayat Raj Act, 1993 (5) was substituted by Act 44 of 2015 with effect from 25.02.2016, as follows:

CHAPTER XVI 1 [Administration, Inspection, Supervision and Creation of Commissionerate of Gram Swaraj and Panchayat Raj]

Section 232B of the Constitution of the Karnataka Panchayat Administrative Service: The Government shall constitute a Karnataka Panchayat Administrative Service consisting of such category of posts from the rural development and panchayat raj department, the number of posts, scale of pay, method of recruitment and minimum qualifications shall be such as may be prescribed]. Inserted by Act 44 of 2015 with effect from 25.02.2016.

Urban Local Governance 
Urban areas in Karnataka are governed by different municipal bodies; 10 Municipal Corporations, 59 City Municipal Councils, 116 Town Municipal Councils, 97 Town Panchayats and 4 Notified Area Committees. The Municipal Corporations are administered under the State under Karnataka Municipal Corporations Act, 1976, while the rest are under the Karnataka Municipalities Act, 1964. The administration at Bruhat Bangalore Mahanagara Palike is overseen by the state government directly, while the Directorate of Municipal Administration does it for the rest of the urban local governments in Karnataka. The categorisation of urban areas is done on the following basis:

The Karnataka Municipal Corporations Act, 1976 mandates constituting both Ward Committees and Area Sabha in each corporation. The rules for setting these up are given in Karnataka Municipal Corporations (Wards Committees) Rules, 2016. Ward Committees in the state have been defunct in cities where they have been formed, with the meetings being erratic or not publicised to the ward members. Since the provision for setting up Ward Committees was only given in the municipal act meant for municipal corporations, only cities with population of 3 lakh or more were mandated to form them. In January 2020, the Urban Development Department of the Karnataka Government announced that Ward Committees would be formed in all urban local bodies in the state, irrespective of their population.

Executive
A district of an Indian state is an administrative unit headed by a deputy commissioner or district magistrate, an officer belonging to the Indian Administrative Service. The district magistrate or the deputy commissioner is assisted by a number of officers belonging to Karnataka Civil Service and other Karnataka state services.

A Deputy Commissioner of Police, an officer belonging to the Indian Police Service is entrusted with the responsibility of maintaining law and order and related issues of the district. The commissioner is assisted by the officers of the Karnataka Police Service and other Karnataka Police officials. A Deputy Conservator of Forests, an officer belonging to the Indian Forest Service, is responsible for managing the forests, environment and wildlife related issues of the district. He is assisted by the officers of the Karnataka Forest Service and other Karnataka forest and wildlife officials. Sectoral development is looked after by the district head of each development department such as PWD, Health, Education, Agriculture, Animal husbandry, etc. These officers belong to the State Services.

Police Administration
The state is divided into 30 police districts, 77 sub-divisions, 178 circles, State Police consists of 20 police districts, 6 Police Commissioners at Bangalore, Mysore, Mangalore, Belagavi, Hubli-Dharwad and Kalaburgi cities, 77 sub-divisions, 178 circles, 927 police stations, and 317 police outposts. There are seven ranges: Central Range at Bangalore, Eastern Range at Davanagere, Northern Range at Belagavi, Southern Range at Mysore and Western Range at Mangalore, North Eastern Range Kalaburgi and  Ballari range. The government Railway Police is headed by a ADGP of Police.

Units that assist the state in law and order include Criminal Investigation Department (Forest Cell, Anti-Dowry Cell, etc.), Dog Squad, Civil Rights Enforcement Wing, Police Wireless and Police Motor Transport Organization and special units. Village Defence Parties protect persons and property in the village and assist the police when necessary. The police force is at times supplemented by Home Guards.

Politics

Karnataka politics is dominated by the Bharatiya Janata party (BJP), Indian National Congress (INC) and Janata Dal (Secular).

In recent election conducted in May 2018 BJP emerged as single largest party with 104 seats leaving behind INC with 79, JDS with 38, BSP with 1 and other 2 independent seats. While B. S. Yeddyurappa went ahead with the intention of making the government and requested the governor to allow him to form a government without the numbers though. Governor allowed him to take oath as Chief Minister on 17 May 2018 although his happiness was short-lived, as SC struck down 2 weeks of time provided by the governor for the floor test to just 2 days. He was forced to resign unable to prove the majority. After his resignation H. D. Kumaraswamy was sworn in as the Chief Minister on 23 May 2019 with absolute majority support from Congress total of 117.

In later bypolls JDS+Congress combine won 4 out of 5 seats 3MP & 2 MLA seats making the numbers up by 119.

On 23 July 2019 the government headed by H. D. Kumaraswamy fell short of majority in the trust vote due to the resignation of 17 MLAs from the Congress and the JDS.

B. S. Yeddiyurappa once again took oath as the chief minister for the 4th time on 26 July 2019.

Elections
Last assembly elections: 2018 Karnataka Legislative Assembly election

The by-elections for the 15 constituencies : 2019 Karnataka Legislative Assembly by-elections

See also
Karnataka
List of Chief Ministers of Karnataka
2019 Karnataka political crisis

References

External links 
 
 https://web.archive.org/web/20070311212509/http://www.kar.nic.in/kla/histry.htm
 http://www.karnataka.com/govt/
 https://web.archive.org/web/20100619201924/http://kla.kar.nic.in/cabm.htm
 Police
 http://www.karnatakastatepolice.org/First.htm
 Judiciary
 http://www.ebc-india.com/lawyer/hcourts.htm
 http://pib.nic.in/archieve/lreleng/lyr2003/roct2003/30102003/r301020037.html
 http://karnatakajudiciary.kar.nic.in/
 Transport
 http://www.rto.kar.nic.in Transport Department - All RTO's in Karnataka
 LNG
 http://www.theoilandgasyear.com/news/asias-largest-fsru-planned-for-karnataka/

 
Government of Mysore